Calochortus balsensis is a Mexican species of flowering plants in the lily family. It is native to the States of Guerrero and Oaxaca in the southwestern part of the country.

Calochortus balsensis is a bulb-forming perennial up to 100 cm tall. Flowers are nodding, globose or subglobose, yellow.

References

External links

Wildflowers and Plants of Central Mexico — photos.
Pacific Bulb Society, Calochortus Species One — photos of several species including Calochortus balsensis.

balsensis
Endemic flora of Mexico
Flora of Guerrero
Flora of Oaxaca
Plants described in 1991